These are the official results of the Women's Shot Put event at the 1983 World Championships in Helsinki, Finland. The final was held on Friday August 12, 1983. The qualification mark was set at 17.00 metres.

Medalists

Schedule
All times are Eastern European Time (UTC+2)

Abbreviations
All results shown are in metres

Records

Qualification

Group A

Group B

Final

See also
 1978 Women's European Championships Shot Put (Prague)
 1980 Women's Olympic Shot Put (Moscow)
 1982 Women's European Championships Shot Put (Athens)
 1983 Shot Put Year Ranking
 1984 Women's Olympic Shot Put (Los Angeles)
 1986 Women's European Championships Shot Put (Stuttgart)
 1988 Women's Olympic Shot Put (Seoul)

References
 Results

S
Shot put at the World Athletics Championships
1983 in women's athletics